Jean Paul Casimir E. Boumsong (born May 20, 1986) is a Cameroonian footballer (striker) who currently plays for Perseru Serui.

Honours

Individual 
Persebaya DU (Bhayangkara F.C.)

 Premier Division Top Scorer: 2013

Persikad Depok
 Premier Division Top Scorer: 2008–09

External links
 Profile at liga-indonesia.co.id
 

Living people
Cameroonian footballers
Cameroonian expatriate footballers
Association football forwards
Expatriate footballers in Indonesia
Liga 1 (Indonesia) players
Persebaya Surabaya players
Persik Kediri players
Persikad Depok players
Persitara Jakarta Utara players
PSPS Pekanbaru players
Persikabo Bogor players
Persipasi Bekasi players
Perseru Serui players
PSSB Bireuen players
Badak Lampung F.C. players
Bhayangkara F.C. players
1986 births